or DBCLS, is a Japanese research institute and part of the Research Organization of Information and Systems. It was founded in 2007.

BioHackathon
DBCLS has been organizing annual BioHackathon event since 2008  and co-organizing with National Bioscience Database Center (NBDC) since 2011. The main objective of the events is a development of technologies and resources which improves integration, preservation and utilization of databases in life sciences.

Resources at the DBCLS
 Anatomography

External links
 DBCLS Official Website

Notes and references

Research institutes in Japan
2007 establishments in Japan